The Widows of Eastwick is the final novel by John Updike, author of the Pulitzer-prize winning "Rabbit" series. First published in 2008, it is a sequel to his 1984 novel The Witches of Eastwick.

Plot
Thirty years have passed since Alexandra Spofford, Jane Smart and Sukie Rougemont terrorized the Rhode Island town of Eastwick with their witchcraft and cavorted with Darryl Van Horne, possibly the devil. All three women had remarried, left Eastwick and gradually fallen out of touch. They begin to restore their friendship as they one by one become widowed, which is implied to be the work of Jane, the most aggressive of the witches and who had pushed for the death of their romantic rival, Jenny Gabriel, who died of metastasized ovarian cancer shortly after her marriage to Van Horne. After touring the Canadian Rockies (Alexandra), Egypt (Alexandra and Jane) and China (all three), they agree to revisit Eastwick, largely out of unspoken guilt for their role in Jenny's death. While conducting a white magic spell at their rented condominium (part of Van Horne's old mansion), Jane, who had earlier been complaining of odd electric shocks, suddenly dies of an aneurysm of the aorta. Alexandra and Sukie both learn that Jenny's brother, Christopher (who had also been Van Horne's lover) killed Jane using methods involving electrons and quantum physics he learned from Van Horne. He plans to kill the other two witches next but doesn't, possibly because Sukie seduces him.  Alexandra returns to New Mexico, where she previously settled with her second husband after first leaving Eastwick, and Sukie moves to Manhattan with Christopher. The novel ends with the two women happily making plans to meet up for another vacation.

References

Novels by John Updike
2008 American novels
American magic realism novels
Sequel novels
Novels set in Rhode Island
The Witches of Eastwick
Alfred A. Knopf books